"Ska vi gå hem till dig" is a song written and recorded by Lasse Tennander on his 1974 studio album Lars Vegas.

Other versions

Magnus Uggla
Magnus Uggla recorded the song on his 1987 album Allting som ni gör kan jag göra bättre scoring a Svensktoppen hit charting for 12 weeks between 20 March-12 June 1988, peaking at third position.

Miio & Ayo
A Miio & Ayo recording on the 2003 album På vårt sätt failed to enter Svensktoppen on 30 November 2003.

Other recordings
The song has also been recorded by the Streaplers on the 1988 album Streaplers 88. and by Rolandz with Robert Gustavsson, on the 2010 album  Jajamen.

Charts

Miio & Ayo
Weekly charts

Year-end charts

References

1974 songs
Magnus Uggla songs
Swedish-language songs
Swedish songs
Streaplers songs